Panagiotis Zonas (born 19 February 1984) is a Greek professional footballer who plays as a centre-back for Football League club Aspropyrgos, for which he is captain.

Club career
Born in Lamia, Greece, Zonas made his senior debut with Greece side Thrasyvoulos, in the 2009–10 season and had the contract with the club until July, 2012. On 1 July 2012, he joined Aiolikos. He profoundly played for Greek clubs.

Initially signed by the Greek club Lamia, he had no appearance for the senior squad and followed a transfer to Levadiakos in 2005. He then signed a contract of one year with Greek club playing in Greece namely Panargiakos and remained for the club until 2008. In the mid of 2008 Zonas signed a year spell with the Greece side Rouf and in 2009 he was at Vyzas. Until 2009 he had no major impact. Zonas penned a deal with Greek club Thrasyvoulos securing major 55 appearances for the club and netted the ball twice. The Greek gained a decent momentum for having long-enough period that he appeared for the club.

He then moved to Aiolikos in 2012 and a transfer to Cypriot Second Division side PAEEK followed whereby he remained until 2013.This was the first ever time that Zonas has moved out of the home-nation in order to pursue senior-career.

He returned to Greece and played for Attican side Doxa Vyronas and further moved to Glyfada in 2014 where the defender earned 8 caps for the club. In 2014, he moved to Acharnaikos F.C. and played a fabulous 33 games whereby the defender made a huge rise in market value.

The Greek was transferred to Trikala and the fame rose. He played for Trikala, considerable, 22 games.
 
Zonas moved to Olympiacos Volou and Rodos in 2017 and 2018 respectively. Finally Panagiotis is playing in Greece for Aspropyrgos also acting as a skipper of the side.

Meanwhile he had also appeared in Greek Football Cup or Kypello Elladas (Greek).

References

1984 births
Living people
Greek footballers
Association football defenders
Cypriot Second Division players
Football League (Greece) players
Enosi Panaspropyrgiakou Doxas players
Rodos F.C. players
PAS Lamia 1964 players
Trikala F.C. players
Acharnaikos F.C. players
Doxa Vyronas F.C. players
A.O. Glyfada players
PAEEK players
Thrasyvoulos F.C. players
Vyzas F.C. players
Rouf F.C. players
Panargiakos F.C. players
Levadiakos F.C.
Greek expatriate footballers
Greek expatriate sportspeople in Cyprus
Expatriate footballers in Cyprus
Footballers from Lamia (city)